Chudenín is a municipality and village in Klatovy District in the Plzeň Region of the Czech Republic. It has about 600 inhabitants.

Administrative parts
Villages of Fleky, Hadrava, Liščí, Skelná Huť, Suchý Kámen, Svatá Kateřina and Uhliště are administrative parts of Chudenín.

References

Villages in Klatovy District